Kaiu Parish was an Estonian municipality located in Rapla County. It had a population of 1,700 (as of 2000) and an area of 261 km2.

In 2017, Kaiu Parish was merged into Rapla Parish.

Settlements
Small borough
Kaiu

Villages
Kuimetsa - Karitsa - Kasvandu - Oblu - Põlliku - Suurekivi - Tamsi - Tolla - Toomja - Vahastu - Vana-Kaiu - Vaopere

References

External links